The Church of St Andrew in Cheddar, Somerset, England dates from the 14th century and has been designated as a Grade I listed building.

The church was restored in 1873 by William Butterfield. It contains some 15th-century stained glass and an altar table of 1631. The chest tomb in the chancel is believed to be to Sir Thomas Cheddar and is dated 1442.

The oldest bell dates from circa 1580.

St Andrew's is the Church of England parish church for Cheddar. The Rector is The Reverend Stuart Burns, who was licensed as priest-in-charge in February 2016.

See also

 List of Grade I listed buildings in Sedgemoor
 List of towers in Somerset
 List of ecclesiastical parishes in the Diocese of Bath and Wells

References

14th-century church buildings in England
Church of England church buildings in Sedgemoor
Grade I listed churches in Somerset
Grade I listed buildings in Sedgemoor
Saint Andrew